Thiobuscaline, or 3,5-dimethoxy-4-butylthiophenethylamine]], is a lesser-known psychedelic drug.

History

It is an analog of buscaline. Thiobuscaline was first synthesized by Alexander Shulgin. In his book PiHKAL (Phenethylamines i Have Known And Loved), the dosage range is listed as 60–120 mg, and the duration is listed as 8 hours. Thiobuscaline is an entheogen, and it causes a threshold. Very little data exists about the pharmacological properties, metabolism, and toxicity of thiobuscaline.

See also 

 Phenethylamine
 Mescaline
 Psychedelics, dissociatives and deliriants

References

Psychedelic phenethylamines
Thioethers
Methoxy compounds